The redwing (Turdus iliacus) is a type of bird in the thrush family.

Red Wing(s) or Redwing(s) may also refer to:

Arts and entertainment
 Red Wing (film), a 2013 Western starring Bill Paxton
 Redwing (Marvel Comics), the pet bird and sidekick of the Marvel Comics character Falcon
 Redwing (comics), a DC Comics character
 Redwing (book), a fantasy novel by Holly Bennett
 "Red Wing" (song), a 1907 song by Kerry Mills and Thurland Chattaway
 Red Wings, an airship squadron in the video game Final Fantasy IV
 Redwing Records, an independent record label founded by Bonnie Raitt

People
 Joan Redwing, materials scientist and professor at Pennsylvania State University
 Tatankamani or Red Wing II (c. 1755–1829), Native American leader of the Mdewakanton Dakota
 Princess Red Wing (1896–1987), Native American elder, historian, folklorist and museum curator
 Red Wing (actress) (1884–1974), Native American silent film actress born Lillian St. Cyr

Places

Canada
 Red Wing, a community in the town of The Blue Mountains, Ontario
 Redwing, Saskatchewan, a community north of Prince Albert, Saskatchewan

United States
 Red Wing, Colorado, an unincorporated community
 Redwing, Kansas, an unincorporated community
 Red Wing crater, North Dakota
 Red Wing, Minnesota, a city
 Redwing, West Virginia, an unincorporated community

Sports 
 Adirondack Red Wings, a former minor league ice hockey team
 Redwings, the sports teams of Benet Academy, a high school in Lisle, Illinois, United States
 Detroit Red Wings, a National Hockey League team
 Fredericton Red Wings, a junior ice hockey team in the Maritime Junior A Hockey League
 Hamilton Red Wings, a junior ice hockey team in the Ontario Hockey Association operating between 1960 and 1974
 Rochester Red Wings, a minor league baseball team
 Weyburn Red Wings, a junior hockey team in Weyburn, Saskatchewan, Canada
 Red Wing Manufacturers, a minor league baseball team based in Red Wing, Minnesota, in 1910 and 1911
 Red Wing Stadium, original name of Silver Stadium, Rochester, New York, United States

Transportation

Aviation
 AEA Red Wing, a pioneer aircraft designed by Thomas Selfridge in 1908 and flown by F. W. Baldwin
 Krasniye Kryl'ya, known in English as "Red Wings", a Russian aircraft manufacturer
 Red Wings Airlines, a Russian airline formerly known as Airlines 400
 Red Wing Regional Airport, Wisconsin, near Red Wing, Minnesota

Other transportation
 Red Wing Bridge, a bridge over the Mississippi River connecting Wisconsin to Red Wing, Minnesota
 Red Wing station, an Amtrak train station in Red Wing, Minnesota
 Red Wing, an international night train operated by the Canadian Pacific Railway and Boston and Maine Railroad, between Montreal and Boston
 Redwing (keelboat), an in-shore keelboat from Bembridge, Isle of Wight, England
 Redwing Coaches, an English bus operator

Vessels
 , several ships of the Royal Navy
 , several American naval ships
 USFS Red Wing, a United States Bureau of Fisheries fishery patrol vessel in commission from 1928 to 1939

Other uses 
 Pterolobium, a genus of shrubs ranging from Africa to Asia, sometimes called "redwings"
 Operation Redwing, a nuclear test series conducted by the United States
 Operation Red Wings, a 2005 US counterterrorism mission in Kunar province, Afghanistan
 Redwings Horse Sanctuary, a UK charity that looks after rescued horses and ponies
 Red Wing Pottery, American stoneware, pottery, or dinnerware items made in Red Wing, Minnesota
 Red wings (sexual act), cunnilingus performed on a menstruating partner
 Red Wing Shoes, a footwear company specializing in durable boots
 Red Wing Seminary, a former Lutheran Church seminary in Red Wing, Minnesota
 Red Wing High School, Red Wing, Minnesota
 Minnesota Correctional Facility – Red Wing, a juvenile correctional facility in Red, Wing, Minnesota

See also
 East Red Wing, Minnesota
 North Red Wing, Wisconsin
 Red-winged blackbird (Agelaius phoeniceus), a New World blackbird abundant in North America